Q'illu Suchusqa (Quechua q'illu yellow, suchuy slide, -sqa a suffix, "slidden yellow", also spelled Khellu Suchuskha) is a mountain in the Bolivian Andes which reaches a height of approximately . It is located in the Cochabamba Department, Quillacollo Province, Quillacollo Municipality. Q'illu Suchusqa lies southwest of Wila Qullu Punta.

References 

Mountains of Cochabamba Department